Barbara Rosenblat is a British actress. She is best known as a prolific narrator of audiobooks, for which AudioFile named her a Golden Voice. She has also appeared on screen such as in the Netflix original series Orange Is the New Black as the character Miss Rosa.

Early life
Rosenblat was born in London, England and was raised in New York City in a Jewish family. She attended a Hebrew school as a child.

Career
After returning to London for a family wedding, Rosenblat decided to stay in England. Soon afterwards, she landed a part in a production of Godspell. She continued to work in theatre, as well as various fields of entertainment in the UK such as radio, film and television.

She later returned to the US, and worked at the Library of Congress narrating books for the blind for four years.

On Broadway, she appeared in the musical The Secret Garden and the play Talk Radio.

Awards and honors
AudioFile has named Rosenblat a Golden Voice narrator.

Awards

"Best of" lists

Audiography 
Rosenblat has narrated more than 400 audiobooks and has been praised for her range of performance in both British and American English accents. She has also narrated a vast range of books across various genres, from classics such as Lewis Carroll’s Alice in Wonderland to the literary fiction of T. C. Boyle or short stories of Kurt Vonnegut to paranormal romance novels by Katie McAllister.

Rosenblat is known for her narrations of well-loved mystery series such as Dorothy Gilman’s Mrs. Pollifax series, Elizabeth Peters‘s Amelia Peabody series, and continues to carry many long-running contemporary crime fiction series including:
Kathy Reich’s Temperance Brennen series
Nevada Barr’s Anna Pigeon series
Diane Mott Davidson’s Goldy Schultz series
Linda Fairstein’s Alexandra Cooper series
Lisa Scottoline’s Rosato & Associates series
Jeffery Deaver’s Lincoln Rhyme series
Laura Lippman’s Tess Monaghan series
Carol O’Connell’s Kathleen Mallory series
[Jessica Ellicot]’s Beryl and Edwina Mystery series

Filmography

Film

Television

Video games

References

 Barbara's Recent News - Audiofilemagazine.com

External links

20th-century American actresses
20th-century British actresses
21st-century American actresses
21st-century British actresses
Living people
American television actresses
British television actresses
Actresses from London
British emigrants to the United States
British people of Jewish descent
American people of Jewish descent
Actresses from New York City
British stage actresses
American stage actresses
British film actresses
American film actresses
British voice actresses
American voice actresses
Audiobook narrators
20th-century English women
20th-century English people
21st-century English women
21st-century English people
Year of birth missing (living people)